Ian Jenkins (born 18 May 1962) is a British figure skater. He competed in the pairs event at the 1984 Winter Olympics.

References

External links
 

1962 births
Living people
British male pair skaters
Olympic figure skaters of Great Britain
Figure skaters at the 1984 Winter Olympics
Sportspeople from Bristol